The 2016 Georgian Cup (also known as the David Kipiani Cup) is the twenty season overall and the twenty-seven since independence of the Georgian annual football tournament. The competition began on 15 August and finished on 22 November 2016.

The defending champions are Dinamo Tbilisi, after winning their twelve Georgian Cup last season. The winner of the competition qualified for the first qualifying round of the 2017–18 UEFA Europa League.

Preliminary round
The matches were held on 15 August 2016.

First round
The matches were held on 23 and 24 August 2016.

Second round
The matches were held on 21 September 2016.

Quarterfinals
The matches were held on 19 October 2016.

Semifinals
The matches were held on 2 November 2016.

Final

See also 
 2016 Umaglesi Liga

References

External links
 Official site 

Georgian Cup seasons
Cup
Georgian Cup